The Cold Swedish Winter is a semi-autobiographical BBC radio comedy sitcom by Danny Robins about Geoff (Adam Riches), a marginally successful London stand-up comic living in Sweden. He has relocated when his girlfriend Linda (Sissela Benn) gets pregnant and decides they should raise their child in her home town, the unpronounceable Yxsjö.

Other regular characters are Linda's father, Sten (Thomas Oredsson), mother, Gunilla (Anna-Lena Bergelin), and Goth arsonist brother Anders (Fredrick Andersson); Geoff's expatriate friend Ian (Robins) and Danish Kurd cafe proprietor Soran (Farshad Kolghi).

Recorded on location, the show launched in 2014 and the fourth series was broadcast in November and December 2018 with the fifth beginning in December 2020.

Episode list

Series one

Series two

Series three

Series four

Series five

References 

BBC Radio comedy programmes
2014 radio programme debuts
2021 radio programme endings
Sweden in fiction